Adam Jeffery (born 1971) is an Australian international lawn bowler.

Bowls career
Jeffery won a silver medal in the triples at the 2000 World Outdoor Bowls Championship in Johannesburg.

In addition he has won a medal at the Commonwealth Games winning a silver medal at the 1998 Commonwealth Games in Kuala Lumpur and in 2015 he was inducted into the Australian Hall of Fame.

He has a 100% success rate at the Asia Pacific Bowls Championships, winning four golds from four events. and won three consecutive Hong Kong International Bowls Classic singles titles, in 1997, 1998 and 1999.

References

1971 births
Living people
Bowls players at the 1998 Commonwealth Games
Bowls players at the 2002 Commonwealth Games
Australian male bowls players
Commonwealth Games silver medallists for Australia
Commonwealth Games medallists in lawn bowls
20th-century Australian people
Medallists at the 1998 Commonwealth Games